Mausam Benazir Noor (Bengali: মৌসম বেনজির নূর; born 15 October 1979) is an Indian politician serving as Member of Parliament, Rajya Sabha from West Bengal and Vice Chairperson of West Bengal Commission for Women. She has served as President of Malda district TMC. She has also served as a Member of Lok Sabha for Maldaha Uttar from 2009 until 2019.

Noor hails from a political Bengali Muslim family of Malda, West Bengal. Her uncle A. B. A. Ghani Khan Choudhury has served as Minister of Railways in the Third Indira Gandhi Ministry. She studied at La Martiniere Calcutta and received a law degree from Calcutta University. After her mother Rubi Noor (the then incumbent Member of Legislative Assembly of West Bengal for Sujapur constituency) had died in 2008, Mausam entered politics. In early 2009, she was elected to the Legislative Assembly from the same constituency and in May she was elected to the Lok Sabha. Noor was elected president of the West Bengal Youth Congress in 2011. Two years later, she was elected president of the Congress party's Malda district unit. In January 2019, she switched to Trinamool Congress party after her proposal of an electoral alliance with the party for the 2019 general election was turned down by the Pradesh Congress Committee.

Early and personal life 
Noor belongs to a political Bengali Muslim family from the Malda district. Her mother, Rubi Noor, was elected to the West Bengal Legislative Assembly for three consecutive terms from the Sujapur constituency. Rubi was married to her classmate and Mausam's father Syed Noor. She accompanied her husband to Canada before entering politics in 1991. Mausam has two elder sisters — Syeda Saleha Noor and Sonya Sarah Noor.

One of Noor's uncles, A. B. A. Ghani Khan Choudhury, served as Minister of Railways in the Third Indira Gandhi ministry. Her other uncle, Abu Hasem Khan Choudhury, is serving as a Member of Parliament for the Maldaha Dakshin constituency. Abu Hasem's son, Isha Khan Choudhury, is a member of the West Bengal Legislative Assembly and represents the Sujapur constituency.

Noor studied at La Martiniere Calcutta and received a law degree from the Calcutta University. She worked at the legal firm Fox and Mandal and practised as a full-time lawyer in the Supreme Court of India for two years before entering politics. She married her long-time boyfriend Mirza Kayesh Begg of Asansol on 5 December 2009. She met him in 2004 while studying law at Calcutta University.

Political career

Indian National Congress

On 10 July 2008, the Sujapur constituency fell vacant due to the death of Noor's mother, sitting Member of Legislative Assembly Rubi Noor. Subsequently, the Indian National Congress party announced that Mausam would contest for the upcoming by-election from the constituency. She won the election and defeated her nearest rival, Haji Ketabuddin of the Communist Party of India (Marxist) by a margin of 21,205 votes.

On 20 May 2009, Noor was elected to the Lok Sabha, representing the Maldaha Uttar constituency. She became one of the five youngest members and the youngest Muslim woman to be elected to the 15th Lok Sabha. On 31 August, she became a member of the Standing Committee on Labour. On 23 September, she became a member of the Standing Committee on Empowerement of Women and a member of Consultative Committee of Ministry of Youth Affairs and Sports.

In March 2011, Noor was elected president of the West Bengal Youth Congress. She was supported by the Indian Youth Congress general-secretary Rahul Gandhi and defeated Arindam Bhattacharya. In December 2013, she succeeded her uncle Abu Hasem Khan Choudhury as the party president for the Malda district.

During Noor's first term as an MP,  of road was built in her constituency under the Pradhan Mantri Gram Sadak Yojana. Also, under the Rajiv Gandhi Grameen Vidyutikaran Yojana (Rajiv Gandhi Village Electrification Scheme), 1.33 billion was sanctioned for her constituency. Moreover, 850 million was sanctioned for the National Highway 81 (running from Gazole to Harishchandrapur), 290 million for Ratua-Nakatti Bridge, 330 million under Backward Regions Grant Fund to review erosion caused by the Mahananda River and 320 million for a Samsi railway overbridge. However, she alleged that these projects could not be implemented as the state government refused to co-operate.

In March 2014, the Congress party announced that Noor would participate from her own constituency for the upcoming general election. She was re-elected after defeating Khagen Murmu of the Communist Party of India (Marxist) by a margin of 65,705 votes. She was polled 388,000 votes. From 1 September 2014 to 31 August 2015, she served as a member of Committee on Papers Laid on the Table and Standing Committee on Rural Development. On 1 September 2014, she also became a member of Consultative Committee, Ministry of Minority Affairs.

Although Malda has been a bastion of the Congress party, they lost a large number of Zilla Parishad elections and Panchayat samiti elections to the ruling Trinamool Congress with Bharatiya Janata Party making inroads in the region. To make amends, Noor started organizing rallies and visiting villages.

Trinamool Congress

Noor left the Congress party and joined the Trinamool Congress on 28 January 2019 after her proposal to form an electoral alliance with the ruling Trinamool Congress was turned down by the Pradesh Congress Committee.

Subsequently, Noor was elevated to the post of the General-Secretary of the party. The party also announced that she would contest from her own constituency (Maldaha Uttar) in the upcoming 2019 general election. She also became the party in-charge for the Uttar Dinajpur, Dakshin Dinajpur and Malda districts. On 30 January, she organized a rally at Malda in which had fourteen panchayat members and one councillor of English Bazaar switch to Trinamool.

In the election, Noor lost to Khagen Murmu of Bharatiya Janata Party, her nearest rival by a margin of 84,288 votes. She was polled 425,236 votes. Subsequently, the party made her the party president of the Malda district unit on 26 May.

In the Rajya Sabha election 2020, Noor was nominated for Rajya Sabha election from West Bengal by the Chief Minister of West Bengal Mamata Banerjee.

Views
Noor favoured an electoral alliance between the West Bengal Pradesh Congress and the Trinamool Congress to fight against Bharatiya Janata Party. However, the Pradesh Congress chief Somen Mitra rejected the proposal as they were keen to form an alliance with the Communist Party. In August 2018, she wrote letters to both the Communist Party of India (Marxist) and Trinamool Congress, requesting them to support her party's panchayat members to form panchayat governments in villages where Congress party had a simple majority. In return, she promised that her party would also support these two parties to form panchayat government in villages where they had a simple majority. She said that she wanted to prevent Bharatiya Janata Party,  to form panchayat governments in villages.

References

External links
 

1979 births
Living people
People from Malda district
India MPs 2009–2014
Indian National Congress politicians
Indian National Congress politicians from West Bengal
Trinamool Congress politicians from West Bengal
21st-century Indian Muslims
Women in West Bengal politics
University of Calcutta alumni
Lok Sabha members from West Bengal
People from English Bazar
India MPs 2014–2019
21st-century Indian women politicians
21st-century Indian politicians
20th-century Bengalis
21st-century Bengalis
Women members of the Rajya Sabha